During the 2007–08 season Lincoln City F.C. played in Football League Two after finishing last season in fifth place in the Football League Two and losing another play-off semi-final the previous season. It marked Lincoln's 101st season in the Football League, becoming one of only 26 clubs to have completed 100 or more seasons since the league's formation in 1888. The club are the first club to have reached the milestone without playing top-flight football. This season marked the club's 79th season in the lowest possible division in the Football League, and the 36th season in the fourth tier of English football. The club have now been competing in the fourth tier for nine successive seasons, with their last season in a higher division coming in 1998–99.

Contract expiry dates

Squad

|}

Transfers

Ins
Summer 2007

Loans

Outs
Summer 2007

January 2008

Competitions

Results summary

Results by round

Home Results

Away Results

Fixtures and results

Friendlies

League Two

2007/08 Away Total: 10,629 (23 games)
2007/08 Away Average: 462 
2007/08 Home Average: 93,835 (23 games) | 4,080 
2007/08 Home Average (Excluding Away Fans): 4,080 – (582) = 3,498

FA Cup

League Cup

League Trophy 2007–08

Fred Green Memorial Trophy

Lincolnshire Senior Cup

Head To Head

Statistics

Club

Biggest win
Home
League Two: 4 – 1 vs Barnet Sat 15 Dec
FA Cup: Not Applicable
League Cup: Not Applicable
League Trophy: Not Applicable

Away
League Two: 3 – 0 vs Accrington Stanley Tues 12 Feb
FA Cup: Not Applicable
League Cup: Not Applicable
League Trophy: Not Applicable

Heaviest defeat
Home
League Two: 0 – 4 vs Shrewsbury Town Sat 11 Aug | 0 – 4 vs Darlington Sat 22 Dec
FA Cup:Not Applicable
League Cup:Not Applicable
League Trophy: 2 – 5 vs Hartlepool United Tues 9 Oct

Away
League Two: 0 – 4 vs Milton Keynes Dons Sun 14 Oct | 0 – 4 vs Peterborough United Sat 29 Mar
FA Cup: 1 – 3 vs Nottingham Forest Tues 27 Nov
League Cup: 1 – 4 vs Doncaster Rovers Tues 14 Aug
League Trophy:Not Applicable

Highest attendance
Home
League Two: 5,286 vs Bradford City Fri 7th Sept
FA Cup: 7,361 vs Nottingham Forest Sat 10 Nov
League Cup: Not Applicable
League Trophy: 936 vs Hartlepool United Tues 9 Oct

Away
League Two: 15,510 vs Bradford City Wed 26 Dec
FA Cup: 6,783 vs Nottingham Forest Tues 27 Nov
League Cup: 5,084 vs Doncaster Rovers
League Trophy: Not Applicable

Lowest attendance
Home
League Two: 3,189 vs Accrington Stanley Sat 25 Aug
FA Cup: 7,361 vs Nottingham Forest Sat 10 Nov
League Cup: Not Applicable
League Trophy: 936 vs Hartlepool United Tues 9 Oct

Away
League Two: 1,281 vs Accrington Stanley Tues 12 Feb
FA Cup: 6,783 vs Nottingham Forest Tues 27 Nov
League Cup: 5,084 vs Doncaster Rovers
League Trophy: Not Applicable

Individual

Goal scorers

Discipline

3 Points for a yellow card
6 Points for a red card

See also

Lincoln City F.C. seasons
Lincoln City